Gianfranco Clerici (born 29 July 1941) is an Italian writer of numerous screenplays for Italian film and television productions. He has collaborated with several directors of exploitation cinema, including Lucio Fulci and Ruggero Deodato. Many of his scripts went on to become controversial films.

Biography
Clerici was born in Bergamo.

He began his career writing genre films, such as spy thrillers (popularized by the James Bond series) and spaghetti westerns. As genre films fell out of favor with audiences, he moved on to writing giallo films, including Don't Torture a Duckling and later The New York Ripper, both directed by Lucio Fulci. He also wrote several crime films, including Blazing Magnums and Weapons of Death. 

Toward the end of the nineteen seventies, Clerici began to write scripts for more exploitative films, such as Emanuelle Around the World and Nazi Love Camp 27. Also around this time, Clerici began his famous collaboration with director Ruggero Deodato. He wrote the scripts for Last Cannibal World and The House on the Edge of the Park. 

Another Deodato collaboration, Cannibal Holocaust, became his most famous screenplay due to the controversy the film caused upon its release. Ten days after its release, the film was seized and Clerici, Deodato, the film's producers, and a representative of the distribution company were arrested for obscenity. Deodato was later charged with murder after claims had been made that actors were genuinely slain for the production. When these charges were proven false, all defendants were fined and received a four-month suspended sentence after being convicted for obscenity.

Clerici continued writing screenplays throughout the nineteen eighties for both theatrical and television productions. His last projects were television movies and several television series.

Filmography

References

External links

Italian screenwriters
1941 births
Living people
People from Bergamo
Italian male screenwriters
Year of birth missing (living people)